Erika Drew Beck is an American academic administrator serving as the president of California State University, Northridge. She was previously president of California State University Channel Islands.

Education 
Beck earned a Bachelor of Arts degree in psychology from the University of California, San Diego, a Master of Arts in psychology from San Diego State University, and a PhD in experimental psychology from the University of California, San Diego.

Career 
Beck served as president of California State University Channel Islands from 2016 to 2020. Prior to becoming the president of CSUCI, Beck was the provost and executive vice president at Nevada State College in Henderson, Nevada. On October 29, 2020, Beck was named as the new president of California State University, Northridge, with a start date of January 11, 2021.

Personal life
A native of California, Beck is the mother of two children.

References

Living people
American academic administrators
California State University Channel Islands faculty
Presidents of California State University, Northridge
University of California, San Diego alumni
San Diego State University alumni
20th-century American women
21st-century American women
Year of birth missing (living people)
20th-century American people